Anthony Guidera is an American actor who has appeared in many films and television series.

His first role was as a bodyguard in The Godfather Part III. He has also appeared in films such as Species, The Rock, The Postman, Heist and Armageddon.

Guidera has also guest starred in television series such as Renegade, Baywatch, Star Trek: Deep Space Nine and Angel (in the episodes "The Circle" and "The Ring," respectively).

In 1996 he won the MTV Movie Award for Best Kiss with co-star Natasha Henstridge in the film Species (film).

Partial filmography
 The Godfather Part III (1990) - Anthony, the Bodyguard
 Species (1995) - Robbie, Guy Picking Up Sil
 The Rock (1996) - Lead F-18 Pilot
 Precious Find (1996) - Jumper #1
 'Til There Was You (1997) - Maitre D'
 The Postman (1997) - Bridge City Guard
 Heist (1998) - Doorman
 Armageddon (1998) - Co-Pilot Tucker
 The Annihilation of Fish (1999) - Gun Seller

References

External links

1964 births
American male film actors
American male television actors
Male actors from California
Living people
Male actors from San Francisco
20th-century American male actors
21st-century American male actors